The Hindman Ben Franklin is a historic commercial building in Hindman, Kentucky, which formerly held a Ben Franklin five-and-dime-type store.  It was listed on the National Register of Historic Places in 2007.

It is a "distinctive" building constructed of ashlar sandstone in 1913–14, originally to hold the Francis Smith and
Company Department Store.  It is also a contributing building in the Hindman Historic District, which was listed on the National Register in 2013.

By 2012 the building had been rehabilitated and was hosting the offices, gallery, and cafe of the Appalachian Artisan Center.

References

External links 
 Appalachian Artisan Center website

	
Commercial buildings on the National Register of Historic Places in Kentucky
Commercial buildings completed in 1914
National Register of Historic Places in Knott County, Kentucky
Individually listed contributing properties to historic districts on the National Register in Kentucky
Department stores on the National Register of Historic Places
1914 establishments in Kentucky
Sandstone buildings in the United States
Hindman, Kentucky